Kare-kare is a Philippine stew (kare derives from "curry") that features a thick savory peanut sauce.  It is generally made from a base of stewed oxtail, beef tripe, pork hocks, calves' feet, pig's feet or trotters, various cuts of pork, beef stew meat, and occasionally offal. Vegetables, such as eggplant, Chinese cabbage, or other greens, daikon, green beans, okra, and asparagus beans, are added. The stew is flavored with ground roasted peanuts or peanut butter, onions, and garlic. It is colored with annatto and can be thickened with toasted or plain ground rice. Variations of kare-kare can be made with seafood, such as prawns, squid, and mussels, or exclusively from vegetables. 

Condiments and other flavorings are usually added. It is often eaten with bagoong (shrimp paste), sometimes spiced with chili, ginisáng bagoóng (spiced and sautéed shrimp paste), and sprinkled with calamansi juice. Other seasonings are added at the table. Variants may include goat meat or (rarely) chicken.

Traditionally, any Filipino fiesta is not complete without kare-kare.

A more modern twist to the classic Filipino kare-kare uses a different dish as the main meat for this dish. Pork is one of the most economical and easiest meats to cook.  The most common meats repurposed for kare-kare are lechon (which is also used for lechon kawali) and crispy pata (crispy pork shank). Alternative main proteins are tofu, beef chuck, beef shank, and maskara ng baka or cartilage from the cow's face, and tripe.

History
Kare-kare's history as a Filipino food goes back hundreds of years. There are four stories as to the origins of kare-kare. The first one is that it came from Pampanga (the province which became known all over the country as the "culinary capital of the Philippines"). The Kapampangan people often have a reputation for cooking to their hearts’ content and coming up with deliciously rich fare. The second is that the dish, specifically the sauce, from the galleon ships of Acapulco. Its key ingredient, the mani or peanut, was widely transported in it just like corn, also from the Aztec Empire and from a distant land. Mexico's Costa Pacifica provinces of Jalisco and Guerrero continue to serve Lomo Encacahuatado, practically the same dish. The only difference is the type of pork part. In Mexico it is the loin/ Lomo or Maciza. In the Philippines, it is the pork tail or oxtail. The word "Kare-Kare" is supposedly a diminutive of "Cari" which was a term to denote "golden brown"--- in fact it was what the Spaniards and Portuguese called the brown natives they saw at their ports of call. The third comes from the regal dishes of the Moro elite who settled in Manila before the Spanish arrival (in Sulu and Tawi-Tawi, kare-kare remains a popular dish). The fourth story is from Indian sepoys from Southern India that settled in Philippines during the British occupation of Manila. Homesick, they improvised their own cuisine with available materials. They called it kari-kaari, curry, and now, kare-kare. Kare-kare has a similar flavor to satay because of the peanuts in the sauce.

Preparation

The Oxtail (with the skin on) is cut into 2-inch lengths. The ox tripe is boiled until tender. Sometimes pieces of ox feet or shins are added. When the meat is tender, the soup becomes gelatinous. Ground roasted peanuts (or peanut butter) and ground roasted glutinous rice are added to make the soup thicker. Annatto is added to give color. The vegetables used for kare-kare include young banana flower bud or "heart" (puso ng saging), eggplant, string beans, and Chinese cabbage (pechay).

Kare-kare is often served hot with special bagoong alamang (sauteed salted shrimp paste).

See also

 Adobo
 Afritada
 Balbacua
 Dinuguan
 Escabeche
 Kaldereta
 Mechado
 Menudo (stew)
 Sarsiado
 Tinola
 List of peanut dishes
 List of Philippine dishes
 List of stews

References

External links

Philippine stews
Peanut dishes